Colin Pitchfork (born March 23, 1960) is a British double child-murderer and rapist. He was the first person convicted of rape and murder using DNA profiling after he murdered two girls in neighbouring Leicestershire villages, the first in Narborough, in November 1983, and the second in Enderby in July 1986. He was arrested on 19 September 1987 and was sentenced to life imprisonment on 22 January 1988 after pleading guilty to both murders, with the judge giving him a 30-year minimum term (only for Pitchfork to challenge the minimum term and see it reduced to 28 years on appeal). He was granted parole in June 2021, and was released on licence on 1 September that year. On 19 November the same year, he was recalled to prison for breach of licence conditions.

Life
Pitchfork lived in Newbold Verdon, attending school in Market Bosworth and Desford, until his marriage in 1981 to a social worker, after which he lived in Littlethorpe. The Pitchforks had two sons.

Before his marriage, Pitchfork had been convicted of indecent exposure and had been referred for therapy to the Carlton Hayes Hospital, Narborough.

Pitchfork had obtained work in Hampshires Bakery in Leicester, in 1976, as an apprentice. He continued to work there until his arrest for the murders. He became particularly skilled as a sculptor of cake decorations and had hoped, eventually, to start his own cake decorating business. According to his supervisor, he was "a good worker and time-keeper, but he was moody... and he couldn't leave women employees alone. He was always chatting them up."

Crimes 

On 21 November 1983, 15-year-old Lynda Mann took a shortcut on her way home from babysitting instead of taking her normal route home. She did not return and her parents and neighbours spent the night searching for her. The next morning, she was found raped and strangled on a deserted footpath known locally as the Black Pad. Using forensic science techniques available at the time, police linked a semen sample taken from her body to a person with type A blood and an enzyme profile that matched only 10% of males. With no other leads or evidence, the case was left open.

On 31 July 1986, a second 15-year-old girl, Dawn Ashworth, left her home to visit a friend's house. Her parents expected her to return at 9:30 pm; when she failed to do so they called police to report her missing. Two days later, her body was found in a wooded area near a footpath called Ten Pound Lane. She had been beaten, savagely raped and strangled. The modus operandi matched that of the first attack, and semen samples revealed the same blood type.

An initial suspect was Richard Buckland, a local 17-year-old with learning difficulties who, while innocent of both crimes, revealed knowledge of Ashworth's body, and admitted to the Ashworth crime under questioning, denying the first murder.

DNA profiling
In 1985, Alec Jeffreys, a genetics researcher at the University of Leicester, developed DNA profiling along with Peter Gill and Dave Werrett of the Forensic Science Service (FSS).

Gill commented: 

Using this technique, Jeffreys compared semen samples from both murder victims against a blood sample from Buckland and conclusively proved that both girls were killed by the same man but not by Buckland. Buckland became the first person to have his innocence established by DNA fingerprinting.

Jeffreys later said: 

Leicestershire Constabulary and the FSS then undertook an investigation in which more than 5,500 local men were asked to volunteer blood or saliva samples. This took six months, and no matches were found.

Arrest and conviction
On 1 August 1987, one of Pitchfork's colleagues at the bakery, Ian Kelly, revealed to fellow workers in a Leicester pub (The Clarendon) that he had taken the blood test while masquerading as Pitchfork. Pitchfork had told Kelly that he wanted to avoid being harassed by police because of prior convictions for indecent exposure. A woman who overheard the conversation reported it to police. 

On 19 September 1987, Pitchfork was arrested. During questioning, Pitchfork admitted to exposing himself to more than 1,000 women, a compulsion that  began in his early teens. He later progressed to sexual assault and then to strangling his victims. Pitchfork said this was in order to protect his identity. The Crown rejected this, viewing the motivation for the strangulations as ‘perverted sadism’. During his interviews with the police he admitted his crimes, but lied about the level and nature of the violence he had inflicted on his victims. He pleaded guilty to the two rapes and murders in addition to another incident of sexual assault, and was sentenced to life imprisonment. A psychiatric report prepared for the Court described Pitchfork as possessing a psychopathic personality disorder accompanied with a serious psycho sexual pathology. The Lord Chief Justice at the time of his sentencing said: "From the point of view of the safety of the public I doubt if he should ever be released." The Secretary of State set a minimum term of 30 years; in 2009, Pitchfork's minimum term sentence was reduced on appeal to 28 years.

Parole reviews
On 22 April 2016, the Parole Board for England and Wales heard Pitchfork's case for early release on parole. Pitchfork's advocates presented evidence of his improved character, noting that Pitchfork had furthered his education to degree level and had become expert at the transcription of printed music into braille, for the benefit of the blind. The families of victims Lynda Mann and Dawn Ashworth opposed his release on parole.

On 29 April 2016, the Parole Board announced that Pitchfork's application for release on licence had been refused, but recommended that he be moved to an open prison. In June 2016, Michael Gove, then Justice Secretary, agreed with the board's recommendation, and at some point prior to 8 January 2017, Pitchfork was moved to an undisclosed open prison.  

In November 2017, Pitchfork was seen walking around Bristol, so it was assumed that he had been moved to HM Prison Leyhill in Gloucestershire.

On 3 May 2018, Pitchfork was refused release on licence. The Parole Board said Pitchfork would be eligible for a further review within two years. Lynda's mother said the Parole Board had "listened to us before the murderer". In 2017, it emerged Pitchfork would be released from open prison on unsupervised days out.

2021: release and recall
On 7 June 2021, Pitchfork was granted release on conditional licence. However, under the terms of the Parole Board Reconsideration Mechanism, introduced in 2019, the Secretary of State for Justice, Robert Buckland, had a short time to apply for a review if it was believed the decision was "procedurally unfair" or "irrational". Buckland did apply for a review, and Pitchfork remained in custody pending the outcome. On 13 July 2021 it was reported that the review had been refused and that Pitchfork would therefore be released. He was released on 1 September 2021.

In November 2021, Pitchfork was recalled to prison for breaching his licence conditions by "approaching young women" while on walks from his bail hostel, although he had committed no offences since his release. His second victim's mother, Barbara Ashworth, told BBC News that she was pleased "he's been put away and women and girls are safe and protected from him now". There are complaints that the Parole Board was insufficiently cautious in allowing Pitchfork's release. Justice Secretary Dominic Raab promised a Parole Board review. David Baker, a former police detective who helped capture Pitchfork, believes Pitchfork could deceive the Parole Board and pretend it was safe to release him. Baker maintains Pitchfork is a psychopath and it will never be safe to release him.

2023: consideration for release
The Parole Board's hearing to consider releasing Pitchfork again was postponed to 2023. The options available will be to refuse his release, grant release or recommend he moves from a closed prison to an open prison. Local MP Alberto Costa opposes releasing Pitchfork.

Artwork
In April 2009, a sculpture that Pitchfork had created in prison and which was exhibited at the Royal Festival Hall, Bringing the Music to Life, depicted an orchestra and choir. The sculpture was exhibited as part of a venture by the Koestler Trust, having been purchased by the Festival Hall for £600. Following outrage in the papers and from victim-advocate groups, it was removed from display.

Drama
The killings features in a 2002 episode of Real Crime "Cracking the Killer's Code".  Pitchfork was played by John Duttine.

In 2014, ITV commissioned a two-part television drama, Code of a Killer, based on Pitchfork's crimes and the creation of DNA profiling. It starred John Simm as researcher Alec Jeffreys and David Threlfall as David Baker, the lead police detective. Pitchfork was played by Nathan Wright. The drama was the first broadcast in two 90-minute episodes, on 6 and 13 April 2015. It was subsequently reformatted as three episodes and released on DVD.

The New Tricks episode "Dark Chocolate" refers to  Pitchfork several times and it is ultimately the similarities between Pitchfork's case and the case the UCOS team are currently investigating that leads to the criminal's arrest.

Pitchfork's crimes are also the focus of an episode of the Sky series How I Caught the Killer.

See also
Beenham murders – led to one of the first voluntary mass blood tests in UK criminal history in 1966, and led to a similar outcome as in the Pitchfork case  when the killer originally avoided the test before eventually being caught
Kirk Bloodsworth – the first American sentenced to death to be exonerated post-conviction by DNA testing
Patrick Mackay – a British serial killer who confessed to have murdered up to 13 people, who has been considered for release since 1995
Allan Grimson – British double murderer believed to have murdered up to 22 people, whose release is imminent
John Cannan – murderer and suspected killer of Suzy Lamplugh, eligible for parole in 2022

UK cold cases where the offender's DNA is now known:
Murder of Deborah Linsley
Murders of Eve Stratford and Lynne Weedon
Murders of Jacqueline Ansell-Lamb and Barbara Mayo
Murder of Lindsay Rimer
Murder of Lyn Bryant 
Murder of Janet Brown
Murder of Linda Cook 
Murder of Melanie Hall
Batman rapist, subject to Britain's longest-running serial rape investigation

References

Cited works and further reading
 
 

1961 births
Living people
1983 in England
1983 murders in the United Kingdom
1986 in England
1986 murders in the United Kingdom
20th-century English criminals
Blaby
British people convicted of sexual assault
Criminals from Leicestershire
English murderers of children
English people convicted of murder
English people convicted of rape
English prisoners sentenced to life imprisonment
People convicted of murder by England and Wales
People from Hinckley and Bosworth (district)
Prisoners sentenced to life imprisonment by England and Wales
Rape in the 1980s